Life at the Zoo is a 1946 Soviet short documentary film. At the 19th Academy Awards, it was nominated for Best Documentary Short.

References

External links

1946 films
1946 short films
1946 documentary films
1940s Russian-language films
Soviet short documentary films
Russian black-and-white films
Soviet black-and-white films
1940s short documentary films
Black-and-white documentary films
Russian short documentary films